Gavdari-ye Hormozi (also Romanized as Gāvdārī-ye Hormozī) is a village in Howmeh-ye Gharbi Rural District, in the Central District of Ramhormoz County, Khuzestan Province, Iran. At the 2006 census, its population was 16, in 4 families.

References 

Populated places in Ramhormoz County